Lee–Throckmorton–McDonald House, also known as "Rural Hill," is a historic home located near Inwood, Berkeley County, West Virginia. It was originally built in 1810 as a log home and substantially enlarged in 1880.  It was enlarged again in 1939 and sheathed in a limestone veneer.  The front entrance features a pedimented portico.  A rear kitchen wing was added in 1981.  It was originally built as the miller's house for a grist mill that is no longer extant.

It was listed on the National Register of Historic Places in 2004.

References

Houses on the National Register of Historic Places in West Virginia
Houses completed in 1810
Houses in Berkeley County, West Virginia
National Register of Historic Places in Berkeley County, West Virginia